China National Highway 108 (G108) is a National Highway which connects Beijing through Chengdu to Kunming. In Beijing it is known as Jingyuan Road.

It leaves Beijing at Fuxingmen and heads for Yamenkou, before heading into hillier terrain and leaving Beijing altogether. Both Tanzhe Temple and Jietai Temple are located nearby.

The section to the 4th Ring Road (Beijing) is under construction as a city express road, and the same applies for the stretch to the 6th Ring Road.

Route and distance

See also
 China National Highways

108
Transport in Yunnan
Road transport in Beijing
Transport in Hebei
Transport in Shanxi
Transport in Shaanxi
Transport in Sichuan
Transport in Kunming